A salary calculator is an online application that provides salary information to the user.  The majority of websites offering salary information use a salary calculator function to present this data.  The salary calculator will request a search term, city, and state or zip code as an input. Post entry, the application returns a list of job titles that most closely match the search terms. Once the user selects a job title, the application will generate salary information, typically in the form of a graph.

Salary calculators are usually used by employees to evaluate a salary offer, negotiate a pay raise or calculate their post tax income

References

Calculator